is a city located in Niigata Prefecture, Japan. , the city had an estimated population of 95,706 in 36,201 households, and a population density of 222 persons per km².

Geography
Sanjō is located in an inland region of north-central Niigata Prefecture. It is about 2 hours from Tokyo via the Jōetsu Shinkansen or 4 hours on the Kan-Etsu Expressway and Hokuriku Expressway. The Shinano River flows through the west of it from south to north and the Ikarashi-gawa River flows through the centre of the urbanised area.

Surrounding municipalities
Niigata Prefecture
 Niigata
 Tsubame
 Nagaoka
 Mitsuke
 Uonuma
 Aga
 Gosen
 Kamo
Fukushima Prefecture
 Tadami

Climate
Sanjō has a Humid climate (Köppen Cfa) characterized by warm, wet summers and cold winters with heavy snowfall.

Demographics
Per Japanese census data, the population of Sanjō peaked at around 1985 and has declined steadily since.

History

The area of present-day Sanjō was part of ancient Echigo Province. During the Edo period, the area was part of Sanjō Domain, a feudal domain under the Tokugawa shogunate from 1598 to 1651. Afterwards, it was divided between Nagaoka Domain, Murakami Domain and tenryō territory administered directly by the shogunate. After the start of the Meiji period, the area was organised as part of Minamikanbara District, Niigata. The town of Sanjō was created with the establishment of the modern municipalities system on April 1, 1889. It was raised to city status on January 1, 1934.  Heavy rain causes extensive flooding in 1961 and in 2004. On May 1, 2005, the town of Sakae, and the village of Shitada (both from Minamikanbara District) were merged into Sanjō.

Government

Sanjō has a mayor-council form of government with a directly elected mayor and a unicameral city legislature of 22 members. On November 8, 2020, attorney Ryo Takizawa was elected to become the next mayor of Sanjō.

Economy

Sanjō is traditionally known for its iron crafts, notably knives and scissors. The following are headquartered in Sanjō.
 Snow Peak (camping equipment manufacturer)
 Marunao (chopsticks manufacturer)
 Suwada (nail care manufacturer) 
It is also one of the municipalities where a local Factory Festival takes place once per year in October (Kouba no Saiten).

Education
Sanjō has 25 public elementary schools and nine public middle schools operated by the city government. There are four public high schools operated by the Niigata Prefectural Board of Education, and the prefecture also operates one special education school.

Transportation

Railway
 JR East - Jōetsu Shinkansen 

 JR East - Shin'etsu Main Line
 -  -  -  - 
 JR East - Yahiko Line
Tsubame-Sanjō -  -

Highway
 Hokuriku Expressway – Sanjō IC

Sister cities
  Vaughan, Ontario, Canada (since October 18, 1993)
  Ezhou, China (since April 28, 1994)

Notable people from Sanjō 
 Chihiro Kaneko (baseball player)
 Masayuki Kakefu（baseball player）
 Tetsuji Morohashi (lexicographer)
 Shohei Baba (baseball player, professional wrestler)
 Kumi Mizuno (motion picture actress)

References

External links 

Official Website 
Slow and Steady Shitada, official website for the Shitada area of Sanjo, featuring many outdoor destinations and activities 

 
Cities in Niigata Prefecture